Cora hafecesweorthensis is a species of basidiolichen in the family Hygrophoraceae. Found in Colombia, it was formally described as a new species in 2016 by Bibiana Moncada, Robert Lücking, and Rouchi Nadine Peláez-Pulido. The specific epithet hafecesweorthensis refers to Hafecesweorthe, an early Anglo-Saxon name for Hawksworth in Yorkshire, and an indirect tribute to mycologist David Leslie Hawksworth. The lichen is only known from its type locality in the Bosques Peña de Santa Bárbara Natural Reserve in Cundinamarca. The lichen grows on the ground, between other lichens and bryophytes.

References

hafecesweorthensis
Lichen species
Lichens described in 2016
Lichens of Central America
Taxa named by Robert Lücking
Basidiolichens